Mirjam Wiesemann (born 1964) is a German actress and author. She is a co-founder of Cybele Records, and the artistic director and speaker of its audiobooks, with a focus on contemporary music.

Early life and education 
Wiesemann was born in Düsseldorf the daughter of the pianist and composer Bernd Wiesemann. She studied acting in her hometown.

Career
Wiesemann has appeared on stage in Krefeld, Bochum, Köln, Düsseldorf and Bonn. She has performed in films and television plays, including the series Auf Achse,  and Lindenstraße. She played the part of Edelfräulein in Helge Schneider's film .

In 2004 she was a co-founder of Cybele Records, together with her husband . She has been the artistic director and speaker of its audiobooks, a series "Wort und Musik" related to music. Titled "Künstler im Gespräch" (Artists in conversation), she introduces the music of contemporary composers in selected examples from their compositions and conversation, for example talking to the son of Karl Amadeus Hartmann, with additional historic sound documents by the composer and his wife. She focused on string quartets by Hans Erich Apostel and Requiem music by Hans Werner Henze in 2010, on piano music by Pierre Boulez, including the first complete recording of his compositions for piano, in 2013, concertos by Jacqueline Fontyn in 2014, and music for ensemble by Juan Allende-Blin in 2016. In 2014 she published an art book with a sound CD, Weht ein Stadtspaziergang durch den Traum, for the 20th anniversary of Cybele Records.

Awards 
In 2009, Wiesemann was awarded both the ECHO Klassik and the Leopold media prize for the audiobook "Die Prinzessin – Kindergeschichten, geschrieben und gesprochen von Arnold Schönberg" (The Princess – children's stories written and spoken by Arnold Schönberg). She received the ECHO Klassik in 2010 for the audiobook about Hartmann. Her edition of audiobooks about composers received in 2011 the prize for "Beste verlegerische Leistung" (best editorial achievement) of the Deutscher Hörbuchpreis.

Discography 
 : Tangogeschichten (2004)
 : Als hätte die Stille Türen (2005)
 : Vom Mädchen das nicht schlafen wollte (2006)
 Arnold Schönberg: Die Prinzessin – Kindergeschichten, geschrieben und gesprochen von Arnold Schönberg (2008)
 Karl Amadeus Hartmann und das Streichquartett – Mit historischen und neuen Sprachaufnahmen der Familie Hartmann. 3 SACDs with historic sound recordings by Karl Amadeus Hartmann,  in conversation with Hartmann's wife Elisabeth, Mirjam Wiesemann in conversation with Hartmann's son Richard; Cybele Records, Edition "Künstler im Gespräch", 2009 .
 Hans Erich Apostel und das Streichquartett (2010)
 Hans Werner Henze und das Requiem (2010)
 Mirjam Wiesemann: Auf Flügeln in die Tiefe – Geschichten vom Aufwachsen (2010)
 Pierre Boulez und das Klavier (2013)
 Jacqueline Fontyn und das Konzert (2014)
 ''Juan Allende-Blin und das Ensemble (2016)

References

External links 
 
 
 Wiesemann, Mirjam stimmgerecht.de
 Mirjam Wiesemann klangbilder.eu

German women writers
German actresses
1964 births
Living people